This is a list of the past and present mayors of Cambridge, Massachusetts.

Mayors

City managers

References

 List of the mayors from 1845 to 1896.
The Mayors of Cambridge since 1893 from the Cambridge Civic Journal
Mayors of Cambridge, Massachusetts from The Political Graveyard
Organizational chart – Cambridge Municipal Government structure

Cambridge
Cambridge

History of Cambridge, Massachusetts